Bimba Raikar is an Indian politician. She was a Member of Parliament, representing Karnataka in the Rajya Sabha the upper house of India's Parliament as a member of the Indian National Congress.

References

1933 births
Living people
Rajya Sabha members from Karnataka
Indian National Congress politicians from Karnataka
Women members of the Rajya Sabha
Women members of the Karnataka Legislative Assembly